An electronic keyboard, portable keyboard, or digital keyboard is an electronic musical instrument, an electronic derivative of keyboard instruments. Electronic keyboards include synthesizers, digital pianos, stage pianos, electronic organs and digital audio workstations. In technical terms, an electronic keyboard is a synthesizer with a low-wattage power amplifier and small loudspeakers.

Electronic keyboards are capable of recreating a wide range of instrument sounds (piano, Hammond organ, pipe organ, violin, etc.) and synthesizer tones with less complex sound synthesis. Electronic keyboards are usually designed for home users, beginners and other non-professional users. They typically have unweighted keys. The least expensive models do not have velocity-sensitive keys, but mid- to high-priced models do. Home keyboards typically have little, if any, digital sound editing capacity. The user typically selects from a range of preset "voices" or sounds, which include imitations of many instruments and some electronic synthesizer sounds. Home keyboards have a much lower cost than professional synthesizers. Alesis, Casio and Yamaha are among the leading manufacturers of home keyboards.

Terminology

An electronic keyboard may also be called a digital keyboard, or home keyboard, the latter often refers to less advanced or inexpensive models intended for beginners. The obscure term "portable organ" was widely used in Asian countries to refer to electronic keyboards in the 1990s, due to the similar features between electronic keyboards and electronic home organs, the latter of which were popular in the late 20th century.

In Russia, Belarus and Ukraine, most types of electronic keyboards (including digital pianos and stage pianos) were simply often referred to as a "synthesizer" (Russian: синтезатор, sintezator), usually with no other term to distinguish them from actual digital synthesizers.

The term electronic keyboard may also be used to refer to a synthesizer or digital piano in colloquial usage

Components
The major components of a typical modern electronic keyboard are:
 Musical keyboard: The white and black piano-style keys which the player presses, thus connecting the switches, which trigger the electronic circuits to generate sound. Most keyboards use a keyboard matrix circuit to reduce the amount of wiring necessary. Electronic keyboards often use unweighted synthesizer-style keys to save costs and reduce the weight of the instrument. In contrast, stage piano and digital pianos typically have weighted or semi-weighted keys, which replicate the feel of an acoustic piano.
 User interface system: A program (usually embedded in a computer chip) which handles user interaction with controllers such as the musical keyboard, menus, and buttons. These controllers enable the user to select different instrument sounds (e.g., piano, guitar, strings, drum kit), digital effects (reverb, echo, chorus or sustain), and other features (e.g., transposition, accompaniments, sequencer, recording, external media, etc.). The user interface system usually includes an LCD screen that gives the user information about the synthesized sound they have selected like tempo, or  effects that are activated (e.g., reverb) and other features.
 Computerized musical arranger: A software program which produces rhythms and chords by the means of computerized commands, typically MIDI. Electronic hardware can also do this. Most computerized arrangers can play a selection of rhythms (e.g., rock, pop, jazz).
 Sound generator: A digital sound module, typically contained within an integrated Read-only memory (ROM), which is capable of accepting MIDI commands and producing electronic sounds. Electronic keyboards usually incorporate sample-based synthesis, but more advanced keyboards might sometimes feature physical modeling synthesis.
 Amplifier and speakers: an internal audio power amplifier, typically ranging from 5 to 20 watts, connected to the sound generator chip. The amplifier is then connected to small, low-powered speakers that reproduce the synthesized sounds so that the listener can hear them. Less expensive instruments may have a single mono speaker. Most models usually have two speakers producing stereo sound, often with tweeters for more advanced models.
 Power supply: Keyboards may or may not have an internal power supply system built to the main circuit board, but most modern keyboards are often equipped with an included AC adapter.
 MIDI terminals: Most keyboards usually incorporate 5-pin MIDI connections for data communication, typically so the keyboard can be connected with either a computer or another electronic musical instrument, such as a synthesizer, a drum machine or a sound module, allowing it to be used as a MIDI controller. Not all keyboards have conventional MIDI terminals and connector. The least expensive models may have no MIDI connections. Post-2000s keyboards may have a USB instead, which serve as both input and output in a single connection. since the 2010s, conventional MIDI in/out terminals are only available in professional-grade keyboards, stage pianos and high-end synthesizers, while low-cost home keyboards, digital pianos, and budget synthesizers use USB as the only connection available.
 Flash memory: Some electronic keyboards have a small amount of onboard memory for storing MIDI data and/or recorded songs.
 External storage device: Usually available on professional-grade keyboards and synthesizers, this allows the user to store data in externally connected storage media such as ROM cartridges, floppy disks, memory cards and USB flash drives. Floppy disks and cartridges were obsolete by the early 2000s, with memory cards starting to replace them shortly afterwards. USB storage was originally less common at the time, but was later popularized by Yamaha's lineup of workstation keyboards in 2005 and has become a standard feature ever since. Most keyboards since the 2010s use USB storage, with the exception of some Casio and Korg models.
 Music stand: A metal or plastic rack for holding sheet music or music books upright. The music stand is usually removable to facilitate storage and transportation.
 Sustain jack: If a home keyboard has a sustain feature, replicating the device used on acoustic pianos, only a 1/4" jack is provided. The musician must buy a separate sustain pedal and plug it in. By comparison, on a digital piano, a sustain pedal is often built into the frame. The least expensive home keyboards do not have a sustain function or a sustain pedal jack, which limits their use to early beginners.

History

Classifications
Conventional home keyboards differ from other electronic keyboards due to the design, features and target market:
 Digital piano - Electronic keyboards designed to sound and feel like an ordinary acoustic piano. They typically contain an amplifier and loudspeakers built into the instrument. In most cases they can fully replace acoustic pianos and provide several features, such as recording and saving files to a computer. Many digital pianos can imitate the sounds of several instruments, including a grand piano, electric piano, pipe organ, Hammond organ and harpsichord. They are not sensitive to the climate or humidity changes in a room and there is also no need for tuning, as with acoustic pianos. Digital pianos are often mounted on stands with a fixed sustain (or other) pedal attached to the frame; as such, most are not designed for transportation. The target market is mid-level to advanced pianists.
 Stage piano - A type of high-quality digital piano with weighted keys, designed for professional touring use on stage or in a recording studio. The Hammond organ and electric piano sounds on a stage piano are typically more realistic than those found on a digital piano.
 Synthesizer - Electronic keyboards that use various sound synthesis technologies to produce a wide variety of electronic sounds.
 Workstation - Professional electronic keyboards that combine the features of a synthesizer and a conventional home keyboard. Workstations have a range of high-quality sampled instrument sounds, as well as extensive editing/recording capability, computer connectivity, high-powered speakers, and often include external memory storage for storing customized data, MIDI sequences, and even additional instrument samples. A high-end workstation keyboard may include several features similar to a digital audio workstation computer software, allowing an even more advanced features such as mixing, mastering, sound design, creating loops and patterns, composing electronic music, etc.
 MIDI controller - An electronic keyboard that does not produce a sound of its own. It is used to trigger sounds from a sound module or software synthesizer by means of MIDI cable and connections. MIDI controllers often provide other sliders, knobs and buttons, which enable the player to control elements such as volume.
 Keytar - A small synthesizer that resembles a guitar which can be played in similar position as an electric guitar: worn on a strap over the shoulders, enabling the performer to move around on a stage. The name is a portmanteau of keyboard and guitar.

Compared to digital pianos or stage pianos, digital home keyboards are usually much lower in cost, as they have unweighted keys. Like digital pianos, they usually feature on-board amplifiers and loudspeakers. Stage pianos, however, typically do not have integrated amplifiers and speakers, as these instruments are normally plugged into a keyboard amplifier in a professional concert setting. Unlike synthesizers, the primary focus of home electronic keyboards is not on detailed control or creation of sound synthesis parameters. Most home electronic keyboards offer little or no control or editing of the sounds (although a selection of 128 or more preset sounds is typically provided).

Concepts and definitions

 Auto accompaniment / chord recognition: Auto accompaniment is used on programmed styles to trigger specific chords that will sound when a single key is pressed on the keyboard. For example, when the auto accompaniment feature is on, and the performer presses a "C" note in the low range of the keyboard, the auto accompaniment feature will play a C Major chord. In many keyboards, the auto accompaniment feature will play the automatic chords in a rhythm and style that is appropriate for the musical style (e.g., rock, pop, hip-hop) selected by the performer (see the Accompaniment backing track section for more). When the on-board rhythm track is turned on, the auto-chords will be played automatically in the tempo of the rhythm track. Many keyboards have an option to form on-bass chords, as well as many other complex chords.
 Demonstration: Most keyboards have pre-programmed demo songs. As the name "demo" implies, one usage of these pre-programmed songs is for a salesperson to use to demonstrate the capabilities of the keyboard, in terms of its different voices and effects. The demo songs can also be used for entertainment and learning. Some keyboards have a teaching feature that will indicate the notes to be played on the display and wait for the player to press the right one.
 Velocity sensitivity (also found under the keyword touch sensitivity in some manuals): While the least expensive keyboards are simply "on-off" switches, mid-range and higher-range instruments simulate the process of sound generation in chordophones (string instruments) which are sensitive to the speed (or "hardness") of a key press. Mid-range instruments may only have two or three levels of sensitivity (e.g., soft-medium-loud). More expensive models may have a broader range of sensitivity. For implementation, two sensors are installed for each key: the first sensor detects when a key is beginning to be pressed and the other triggers when the key is pressed completely. On some higher-end electronic keyboards or digital pianos, a third sensor is installed. This third sensor allows the player to strike a key and still sound a note even when the key has not yet come to its full resting position, allowing for faster (and more accurate) playing of repeated notes. The time between the two (or three) signals allows a keyboard to determine the velocity with which the key was struck. As the key weight is constant this velocity can be considered as the strength of the press. Based on this value the sound generator produces a correspondingly loud or soft sound. The least sophisticated types of touch sensitivity cause the keyboard to change the volume of the instrument voice. The most sophisticated, expensive types will trigger both a change in volume and a change in timbre, which simulates the way that very hard strikes of a piano or electric piano cause a difference in tone—as well as an increase in volume. Some sophisticated touch-sensitivity systems accomplish this by having several samples of an acoustic instrument note per key (e.g., a soft strike, a mid-level strike, and a hard strike). Alternatively, a similar effect can be accomplished using synthesis-modelling of the ADSR envelope or digital modelling (e.g., for the hard strike, the keyboard would add the timbres associated with a hard strike—in the case of a Fender Rhodes voice, this would be a biting, "bark" sound).
 After-touch: A feature brought in the late 1980s (although synthesizers like the CS-80 extensively used by artists like Vangelis featured after-touch as early as 1977) whereby dynamics are added after the key is hit, allowing the sound to be modulated in some way (such as fade away or return), based upon the amount of pressure applied to the keyboard.  For example, in some synth voices, if the key continues to be pressed hard after the initial note has been sounded, the keyboard will add an effect such as vibrato or sustain. After-touch is found on many mid-range and high-range synthesizers, and is an important modulation source on modern keyboards. After-touch is most prevalent in music of the mid to late 1980s, such as the opening string-pad on Cock Robin's When Your Heart Is Weak, which is only possible with the use of after-touch (or one hand on the volume control). After-touch is not normally found on inexpensive, beginner-level home keyboards.
 Polyphony: In digital music terminology, polyphony refers to the maximum number of notes that can be produced by the sound generator at once. Polyphony allows significantly smoother and more natural transitions between notes. Inexpensive toy electronic keyboards designed for children can usually only play five to ten notes at a time. Many low priced keyboards can perform 24 or 32 notes at a time. More advanced keyboards can perform over 48 notes at a time with 64 or 128 notes being common. Digital pianos, has more complex polyphonic system and could perform by up to 256 notes.
 Multi-timbre: The ability to play more than one kind of instrument sound at the same time, such as with the Roland MT-32's ability to play up to eight different instruments at once.
 Split point: The point on a keyboard where the choice of instrument can be split to allow two instruments to be played at once. In the late 1980s it was common to use a MIDI controller to control more than one keyboard from a single device. The MIDI controller had no sound of its own, but was designed for the sole purpose of allowing access to more sound controls for performance purposes. MIDI controllers allowed one to split the keyboard into two or more sections and assign each section to a MIDI channel, to send note data to an external keyboard. Many consumer keyboards offer at least one split to separate bass or auto-accompaniment chording instruments from the melody instrument.

 Minikeys: Most electronic keyboards have keys that are similar to the size of keys on an acoustic piano. Some electronic keyboards have minikeys, either because they are targeted at child users or to make the instrument smaller and more portable. 
 Accompaniment backing tracks: Pre-programmed musical accompaniment tracks (also called rhythm pattern or rhythm style by some manufacturers), consist of a variety of genres for the player to use (e.g., pop, rock, jazz, country, reggae). The keyboard plays a chord voicing and rhythm which is appropriate for the selected genre. In general, programmed backing tracks usually imitate the sound of a rhythm section or an ensemble. Certain keyboards may include a feature that allows the performer to create, compose and customize their own accompaniments. This feature is usually called a pattern sequencer, rhythm composer, or a style creator.
 In addition to the basic accompaniment tracks, some keyboards have an extra feature to play different loops in conjunction with the backing track itself.
 Accompaniment sections and synchronization: Usually, backing tracks comprises two to four sections, as well as fill-in patterns, introduction/ending patterns, and various synchronizations to improve the effects of the accompaniment.
 Tempo: A parameter that determines the speed of rhythms, chords and other auto-generated content on electronic keyboards. The unit of this parameter is beats per minute. Many keyboards feature audio or visual metronomes (using graphics on a portion of the display) to help players keep time.
 Auto harmonization: A feature of some keyboards that automatically adds secondary tones to a note based upon chords given by the accompaniment system, to make harmony easier for players who lack the ability to make complex chord changes with their left hand.
 Wheels and knobs: Used to add effects to a sound that are not present by default, such as vibrato, panning, tremolo, pitch bending, and so on. A common wheel on contemporary keyboards is the pitch bend, adjusting the pitch of a note usually in the range of ±1 tone. The pitch bend wheel is usually on the left of the keyboard and is a spring-loaded potentiometer.
 Drawbars: Usually found only on high-end, expensive keyboards and workstations, this feature allows the performer to emulate digitally-modeled sounds of a tonewheel electronic organ (hence drawbar). It consists of nine editable virtual sliders that resemble the drawbars of a tonewheel organ, and features various effects such as rotary speaker, percussion, and tremolo. The setting can be saved to the keyboard's user memory or storage device.
 Piano simulation: A common feature of the digital piano, stage piano, and high-end workstations that allows real-time simulation of a sampled piano sound. It provides various piano-related effects, such as room reverberation, sympathetic resonance, piano lid position (as on a grand piano), and settings to adjust the tuning and overall sound quality.
 Keyboard action describes the mechanism and feel of the keyboard. Keyboards can be roughly divided into non-weighted and weighted.
 Non-weighted keyboards has a light, springy feel to their keys, similar to the action of an organ. The least expensive keyboards, often with non-fullsize keys, uses keys that are mounted on soft rubber pads that also acts as electronic switches. Most electronic keyboards use spring-loaded keys that make some kinds of playing techniques, such as backhanded sweeps, impossible, but make the keyboards lighter and easier to transport. Players accustomed to acoustic piano keys may find non-weighted spring-action keyboards uncomfortable and difficult to play effectively. Conversely, keyboard players accustomed to the non-weighted action may encounter difficulty and discomfort playing on an acoustic piano.
 Weighted keyboards indicate that some kind of effort has been made to give the keyboard more resistance and responsive feel similar to that of an acoustic piano.
 Semi-weighted keys is a term applied to keyboards with spring action like a non-weighted keyboard but that have extra weight added to the keys to give them more resistance and responsive feel.
 Hammer action keys uses some kind of mechanism to replicate the action of a mechanical piano. This is often achieved with some kind of lever mechanism connected to the key.
 Graded hammer action keys does what hammer action keys do, but also has a different feel on the low versus high notes as on a mechanical piano keyboard. The lower note keys have a higher resistance than the higher note keys.

MIDI controls

MIDI, Musical Instrument Digital Interface, is a serial data connection which operates with any make or model of instrument which provides for it.

Electronic keyboards typically use MIDI signals to send and receive data, a standard format now universally used across most digital electronic musical instruments. On the simplest example of an electronic keyboard, MIDI messages would be sent when a note is pressed on the keyboard, and would determine which note is pressed and for how long. Additionally, most electronic keyboards now have a  "touch sensitivity", or "touch response" function which operates by an extra sensor in each key, which estimates the pressure of each note being pressed by the difference in time between when the key begins to be pressed and when it is pressed completely. The values calculated by these sensors are then converted into MIDI data which gives a velocity value for each note, which is usually directly proportional to amplitude of the note when played.

MIDI data can also be used to add digital effects to the sounds played, such as reverb, chorus, delay and tremolo. These effects are usually mapped to three of the 127 MIDI controls within the keyboard's infrastructure – one for reverb, one for chorus and one for other effects – and are generally configurable through the keyboard's graphical interface. Additionally, many keyboards have "auto-harmony" effects which will complement each note played with one or more notes of higher or lower pitch, to create an interval or chord.

DSP effects can also be controlled on the fly by physical controllers. Electronic keyboards often have two wheels on the left hand side, generally known as a pitch bend and a modulation wheel. The difference between these is that the pitch bend wheel always flicks back to its default position – the center – while the modulation wheel can be placed freely. By default, the pitch bend wheel controls the pitch of the note in small values, allowing the simulation of slides and other techniques which control the pitch more subtly. The modulation wheel is usually set to control a tremolo effect by default. However, on most electronic keyboards, the user will be able to map any MIDI control to these wheels. Professional MIDI controller keyboards often also have an array of knobs and sliders to modulate various MIDI controls, which are often used to control DSP effects.

Most electronic keyboards also have a socket at the back, into which a foot switch can be plugged. The most common function is to simulate the sustain on a piano by turning on and off the MIDI control which adds sustain to a note. However, since they are also simple MIDI devices, foot switches can usually be configured to turn on and off any MIDI controlled function, such as switching one of the DSP effects, or the auto-harmony.

Keyboard ensemble
In live performances, multiple electronic keyboards could be played together at one time, each by one musician, forming a keyboard ensemble. Keyboard ensembles are mostly performed within a band on an elaborate stage, while some can even serve as a simpler substitute to the more conventional orchestra, replacing stringed and wind instruments.

See also

 Synthesizer
 Digital piano
 Electronic organ
 MIDI controller
 Sound module
 Software synthesizer

References

Electric and electronic keyboard instruments
Keyboard instruments